KAF, Kaf or Kafs may refer to:

Places
 Mount Qaf or Kaf, a mythical place in medieval Islamic cosmology 
 Kaf, a city in Al Jawf Province, Saudi Arabia
 Kandahar International Airport or Kandahar Air Field (KAF), near Kandahar, Afghanistan

Organisations
 Communist Workers League (Sweden), a Swedish Trotskyist political party now called the Socialist Party
 Kalki Avatar Foundation, a spiritualist organisation based in London, UK
 Korean Alpine Federation, a member of the International Ski Mountaineering Federation
 Kyrgyz Air (ICAO code), a privately owned airline based in Kyrgyzstan
 Karato Airport (IATA code), Papua New Guinea; See List of airports by IATA code: K
 Korean Anarchist Federation, see Anarchism in Korea

Military
 Kenya Air Force, the national Air Force of Kenya
 Khmer National Air Force, the air force branch of the Khmer National Armed Forces, the official military of the Khmer Republic during the Cambodian Civil War between 1970 and 1975
 Kosovo Armed Forces
 Kuwait Air Force, the national Air Force of Kuwait
 Kandahar Air Field

Other uses
 KAF-10500, a CCD imaging sensor
 Kafs, people born in Réunion of Malagasy and/or African origins
 Kaph or kaf, the eleventh letter of many Semitic abjads